Avanangattilkalari Sree Vishnumaya Temple  (alternatively Avanangatt Chathan Temple) is a Hindu temple at Peringottukara, Thrissur District, Kerala state, India. It is dedicated to the god Vishnumaya in Kerala. The god is known also by the names Chathan.

Avanangattilkalari vishnumaya temple is the head temple of all vishnumaya temples in Kerala, especially Malabar.The temple avanangattilkalari call sree vishnumaya "moolasthanam". The god of the temple represents the god in his fierce ('ugra') form, facing East, featuring two  hands with various attributes. One is holding Kuruvadi (Magical wand), another hand magical pot (amrutha kumbam) and riding on water buffalo. The temple deity well known for his magical power.

The temple gain the name Avanangattilkalari because the temple surrounded Ricinus. The Ricinus plant is called in malayalam language "avanaku", forest means malayalam language "kadu", Avananku-kadu then changed avanangattil kalari. Kalari means Kerala traditional martial art practice or teaching location. The temple is often accredited as the original form of Vishnumaya and his 389 brothers. When God born with his 399 other brothers, 10 brothers sacrificed their life in war between Shiva boothas (god Shiva's army) and demon name Briga Rakshas. Ten brothers consumed brahmastra in the time of combat and help Shiva boothas to kill Rakshas Briga.

The temple is in the center of Kerala and is called "vishnumaya chathan temple" by Tamil speakers. The name of chathan coming from sastha. The Temple was built in a remote past and its worship incorporates ancient Shakthyem customs which are rarely observed in contemporary Kerala temples.

History 

The people of Kerala believe that this temple was, in the olden days, a small shrine and it was Kellunni Panicker who installed the murthi of Vishnumaya close to one of his kalari. The pujas are conducted, it is said, under direct instructions from the god himself. Near to temple there is a mango tree and small rock shire is there called "Valliyachan kottil" believed to be the main source of the powers of this deity. The priests are panickers and Thiyyar families who have a right to perform 'Pushpanjalis' to the God.

Avanangattilkalari Sree Vishnumaya temple is allowed all other religious members to attend temple. His temple is very much related to Sabarimala Ayyappa Temple, sastha and chathan is commonly mixed each times. Other than Sabarimala, temple allows all religious women also. The temple reconstructed in the time of Sakthan Thampuran who provided financial support also. Sakthan Thampuran provide one donation champers inside Thriprayar Temple still there in red color. As the old believe in the time of Arattupuzha Pooram festival, Deity travel to Avanangattilkalari Sree Vishumaya temple and meet Sree Vishnumaya, it is called "Pooram Purapad".

Currently Avanangattilkalari temple is administered by temple trust and not taking any aid from Thriprayar temple. The temple was constructed by Kellunni Panicker. The first Shaktheya Pooja in Avanangattilkalari temple was performed by Panicker families still follows.

In ancient times, animal sacrifices were offered at the temple, mostly in the forms of birds, by devotees seeking protection and the fulfillment of their prayers. At present, only red-dyed silks are offered to the deity.

Temple structure 

The temple is situated in the middle of a plot of land about ten acres, surrounded by paddy field. The "manimandapam" or "sreekovil" is facing east. East side of the small bhagavathi shire, two Sarpakavu. West side temple pond, which serve purpose of well (bath not allowed). East and west "padipura"(entrance). North side "ananadhana mandapam" serve devotes every day.

Ritual 
During this ritual, oracle person called Vellichapad, (oracles of the god), addressed as the god and said to be possessed by him, sit in-front of the temple in a frenzied trance state called niyogam. Niyogam will perform every day. Special pooja only perform Full moon or new moon day only. All karma follows saktheya manner.

Festivals

Vellattu maholsavam 

The "vellattumaholsam" festival at the Avanangattilkalari Vishnumaya temple, is a month of festivities from the month of Kumbham, it is ten day festival. It normally falls between the months of February and March. The festival usually starts with a ritual called 'Ezhunallathu', which forms an important feature of this temple. The members of the "Thira manar" are allowed to participate in this ritual. It is to appease the god Vishnumaya and her demons who take delight in the offerings.

Kalampattu 

The kalampattu festival will perform four day before "karkidakam" and "vrichikam" malayalam months (February or march month).

References

External links

Official Website of Vishnumaya Temple

Temples in Kerala
Hindu temples in Thrissur district
Buildings and structures in Thrissur district